The 2017 American Athletic Conference softball tournament was held at the East Carolina Softball Complex on the campus of the East Carolina University in Greenville, North Carolina, from May 10 through May 13, 2017.  The event determined the champion for the American Athletic Conference for the 2017 NCAA Division I softball season.  Top-seeded  won the Tournament for the second year in a row and earned the American Athletic Conference's automatic bid to the 2017 NCAA Division I softball tournament.

Entering the Tournament, Tulsa was defending champion, while UCF had won in 2015.  Former member Louisville won the first Tournament in 2014.

Format and seeding
The American's seven teams were seeded based on conference winning percentage from the round-robin regular season.  They then played a single-elimination tournament with the top seed receiving a single bye.

Results

Tournament

Game results

All-Tournament Team
The following players were named to the All-Tournament Team.

Most Outstanding Player
Emily Watson was named Tournament Most Outstanding Player.  Watson was a pitcher for Tulsa.

References

American Athletic Conference softball tournament
Tournament
AAC softball tournament